Edwin Turner is the name of

 Edwin Turner (politician) (1849–1913)), Australian politician
 Edwin Turner (athlete) (1912–1968), American middle-distance runner